Copitarsia is a genus of moths of the family Noctuidae. The genus was erected by George Hampson in 1906.

Species
Copitarsia anatunca Angulo & Olivares, 1999 Chile
Copitarsia anguloi Castillo, 1991 Chile
Copitarsia basilinea Köhler, 1958 Argentina (Mendoza), Chile
Copitarsia belensis (Köhler, 1973) Argentina
Copitarsia clavata (Köhler, 1952) Argentina (Chubut)
Copitarsia consueta (Walker, 1857)
Copitarsia corruda Pogue & Simmons, 2008 Peru
Copitarsia decolora (Guenée, 1852) Mexico, Guatemala, Costa Rica, Venezuela, Colombia, Ecuador, Argentina, Chile
Copitarsia fleissiana (Köhler, 1958) Argentina (Neuquen)
Copitarsia fuscirena (Hampson, 1910) Argentina (Mendoza)
Copitarsia gentiliana (Köhler, 1961) Argentina (Neuquen)
Copitarsia gibberosa Pogue, 2014 Chile, Argentina (Neuquen, Rio Negro)
Copitarsia gracilis (Köhler, 1961) Argentina
Copitarsia heydenreichii (Freyer, [1850])
Copitarsia humilis (Blanchard, 1852) Chile
Copitarsia incommoda (Walker, 1865) Colombia, Peru, Costa Rica, Argentina
Copitarsia lacustre Angulo & Olivares, 2009 Chile
Copitarsia maxima (Köhler, 1961) Argentina (Neuquen)
Copitarsia mimica Angulo & Olivares, 1999 southern Argentina
Copitarsia murina Angulo, Olivares & Badilla, 2001 Chile
Copitarsia naenioides (Butler, 1882) Chile, Argentina
Copitarsia patagonica Hampson, 1906 Patagonia
Copitarsia purilinea (Mabille, 1885) Patagonia
Copitarsia roseofulva (Köhler, 1952) Bolivia, Chile
Copitarsia sulfurea (Köhler, 1973) Argentina (Neuquen)
Copitarsia tamsi (Giacomelli, 1922) Argentina
Copitarsia turbata (Herrich-Schäffer, [1852])
Copitarsia vivax (Köhler, 1952) Argentina (Chubut)

References

 Pogue, M. G. & Simmons, R. B. (2008). Annals of the Entomological Society of America. 101 (4): 743-762.

Cuculliinae